Rosenau may refer to various places in Europe:

in Austria:
Rosenau am Hengstpaß, Upper Austria
a hamlet near Seewalchen am Attersee, Upper Austria
the boroughs Rosenau Markt and Rosenau Schloss in Zwettl, Lower Austria
Schloss Rosenau, Zwettl, a castle near Zwettl

in Germany:
Rosenau, Brandenburg, in the district of Potsdam-Mittelmark, Brandenburg
Schloss Rosenau, Coburg, a castle in Rödental, Bavaria
a borough of Grafenau, Bavaria
a borough of Engelskirchen, North Rhine-Westphalia
a borough of Langenpreising, Bavaria
Rosenau (Königsberg), a former quarter of Königsberg, Prussia

in France:
Rosenau, Haut-Rhin, a commune in the region of Grand Est

Rosenau is the German name of:

Râşnov, Romania
Rožnov pod Radhoštěm, Czech Republic
Rožňava, Slovakia
Zilupe, Latvia
Jastrzębowo, Poland

Rosenau is the surname of:

James N. Rosenau (1924–2011), American political scientist and international affairs scholar
Milton J. Rosenau (1869–1946), American public health official and professor